Woodside is a historic plantation house located at Buckingham, Buckingham County, Virginia. The main house was built about 1860, and is a two-story, five-bay, "T"-shaped frame dwelling in the Greek Revival style. It consists of a projecting three-bay, pedimented pavilion with flanking one-bay, hip-roofed wings.  It has a hipped roof and is sheathed in weatherboard siding. In 1937 a kitchen wing was added to the rear elevation of the dwelling.  Also on the property are a contributing smokehouse (c. 1860), a covered well and the sites of an icehouse, kitchen, dairy, and corncrib.

It was listed on the National Register of Historic Places in 1993.

References

Plantation houses in Virginia
Houses on the National Register of Historic Places in Virginia
Greek Revival houses in Virginia
Houses completed in 1860
Houses in Buckingham County, Virginia
National Register of Historic Places in Buckingham County, Virginia